Katria is a genus of freshwater fish in the cichlid family. It contains the single species Katria katria, a vulnerable species from the Mangoro and Nosivolo Rivers in east-central Madagascar, that was formerly included in the genus Ptychochromoides. The only other monotypic cichlid genus in Madagascar is Oxylapia, and it is restricted to the same region as Katria. In 2010, the Nosivolo River was designated as a Ramsar Site.

References

Ptychochrominae
Monotypic freshwater fish genera
Freshwater fish of Madagascar
Fish described in 1997
Cichlid genera
Taxonomy articles created by Polbot